Kreuger is a surname. Notable people with the surname include:

David Kreuger, Swedish songwriter
Frederik H. Kreuger (1928–2015), Dutch high-voltage scientist, professor emeritus and a professional author 
Ivar Kreuger (1880–1932), Swedish entrepreneur and "Match King"; failed speculator or swindler
Kurt Kreuger (1916–2006), Swiss-German actor
Nils Kreuger (1858–1930), Swedish painter
Ragnar Kreuger (1897–1997), Finnish industrialist and amateur oologist
Rick Kreuger (born 1948), American baseball pitcher

See also
Kreuger & Toll, former Swedish industrial company
Freddy Kreuger (single), single by Surrey-based rock band Reuben
Krueger
Swedish-language surnames